Drugmulla is a village and tehsil headquarter in Kupwara district of the Indian union territory of Jammu and Kashmir. It is located 5 kilometres from the district headquarters Kupwara.

Demographics
According to the 2011 census of India, Drugmulla had 736 households. The literacy rate of Drugmulla town is 71.51%. The male literacy stands at 82.73% while the female literacy rate was 54.73%.

Education
Some of the institutions of Drugmulla Village which provide quality education to the students of Drugmulla and other areas of the district:
UPS Bandpora Drugmulla
Iqbal Memorial Dugmulla
Imperial Drugmulla
Alfayaz Public School
IDPS Drugmula, Kupwara
Almisba public school.

Transportation

Air
The nearest airport is Srinagar International Airport, 88 kilometres or a two and a half an hour drive away.

Rail
The nearest railway stations are Baramulla railway station and Sopore railway station, located 42 and 50 kilometres from Drugmulla respectively. There are plans to connect Drugmulla by rail by extending the Jammu–Baramulla line to Kupwara which will pass through Drugmulla.

Road
Drugmulla is well-connected by road to other towns and villages in Jammu and Kashmir and the rest of India by the Sopore-Kupwara Road and Drugmulla-Kupwara Road. The NH 701 passes through Drugmulla.

See also
Kupwara
Jammu and Kashmir
Handwara
Karnah

References

External links

Kupwara district
Jammu and Kashmir